Tessmannianthus is a genus of flowering plants in the family Melastomataceae. There are seven species distributed in Central and South America. They are medium to large trees up to 40 meters tall. The flowers are heterantherous, bearing two types of stamens. These plants are rare, and some are narrow endemics known from only one location.

The genus name of Tessmannianthus is partly in honour of Günther Tessmann (1884–1969), a German-Brazilian ethnologist and botanist. He was also an African explorer and plant collector, who later settled in Brazil. The second part of the name, anthos refers to flower.

Known species
 Tessmannianthus calcaratus (Gleason) Wurdack
 Tessmannianthus carinatus Almeda
 Tessmannianthus cenepensis Wurdack
 Tessmannianthus cereifolius Almeda
 Tessmannianthus gordonii Almeda
 Tessmannianthus heterostemon Markgraf
 Tessmannianthus quadridomius Wurdack

References

 
Melastomataceae genera
Taxonomy articles created by Polbot